Mamba is a small town and township-level division in Lhasa prefecture-level city in Maizhokunggar County in the Tibet Autonomous Region of China. Animal husbandry, with the rearing of yak, sheep, goats, and agriculture, with the principal crops being barley, wheat, and canola, is predominant. Geologically, Late Triassic granitoids in the area are mainly "exposed in a fault uplift in the Gangdise tectonic belt". The township is home to Drigung Monastery.

See also
List of towns and villages in Tibet

References

Populated places in Lhasa (prefecture-level city)
Township-level divisions of Tibet